Danielle Stone (born August 20, 1990) is a Canadian ice hockey forward, currently playing with HV71 Dam of the Swedish Women's Hockey League (SDHL).

Career

University 
Across 120 games with the Saskatchewan Huskies of the University of Saskatchewan, Stone scored 71 points. She was a Canada West All-Rookie selection in 2008–09.

Professional 
She was drafted 16th overall by the Calgary Inferno in the 2013 Canadian Women's Hockey League (CWHL) Draft, who she would sign her first professional contract with. In her rookie CWHL season, she scored 25 points in 24 games, as the Inferno made the Clarkson Cup finals for the first time. She would only put up 9 points in 22 games in her second CWHL season, her last in the league.

In 2015, she moved to Sweden to play with IF Sundsvall/Timrå IK in the SDHL. After stepping away from hockey for the 2016–17 season, she signed with Brynäs IF. In the 2017–18 season, she scored 4 points in 12 games with Brynäs. Stone signed with Leksands IF for the 2018–19 season, where she scored 30 points in 36 games, leading the team in goals and setting personal career records in both goals and assists in a season. In May 2019, she left Leksands along with teammate Anna Borgqvist to sign with HV71.

References

External links
 

1990 births
Living people
Canadian women's ice hockey forwards
Ice hockey people from Saskatchewan
Sportspeople from Prince Albert, Saskatchewan
HV71 Dam players
Leksands IF Dam players
Brynäs IF Dam players
IF Sundsvall Hockey players
Timrå IK players
Calgary Inferno players
Saskatchewan Huskies ice hockey players
Canadian expatriate ice hockey players in Sweden